Pierre Marsan (born June 29, 1948 in Montreal, Quebec) is a Quebec politician. He was the member of National Assembly of Quebec for the riding of Robert-Baldwin for the Quebec Liberal Party.

Marsan went to the Université du Québec à Montréal and obtained a bachelor's degree in business administration and would add a master's degree in health administration at Université de Montréal. He was a guest teacher in the faculty of administration at the Université de Montréal and was a director in hospital services at the Hotel-Dieu's Saint-Jérôme Hospital. He was the general manager at the Montreal Heart Institute and the Hôpital du Sacré-Coeur. He was an assistant director at Santa Cabrini Hospital.  He was also a board member for several institutions including the Montreal Heart Institute, the Epic Foundation, the Hôpital du Sacré Coeur Foundation and the president of the Association of Canadian Teaching Hospitals.

Marsan was first elected in Robert-Baldwin in 1994 and was in charged for the electoral campaign program Pour un Quebec en Santé in 1998. He was re-elected for a third term in 2003 and was the parliamentary secretary to the Minister of Health and Social Services and then the Secretary to Jean Charest. He was re-elected for a fourth term in 2007 and named the Parliamentary Secretary to the Minister of Immigration and Cultural Communities.

Political career

Fundraising controversy
On September 16, 2013, a journalist revealed a letter circulating in the Association sépharade de la banlieue ouest de Montréal signed by Pierre Marsan and his chief electoral officer, Aimé Bensoussan. The letter solicited contributions from members of the association, reminding them that the local Jewish community benefited from generous contributions, including a daycare permit, while the Liberals were in power.

The Parti québécois and the Coalition Avenir Québec strongly reacted to the event, claiming that this added to a long list of recent instances of corruption within the Quebec Liberal Party, which has favoured Liberal contributors in daycare permit attributions and other types of financial compensations.

Pierre Marsan formally apologised for his "clumsy" gesture. Party leader Philippe Couillard qualified the incident as "unacceptable", declaring that such practices will never again take place in the party.

On September 17, 2013, the Chief Electoral Officer of Quebec, Jacques Drouin, declared that there would be an inquiry in the constituency of Robert-Baldwin following these events, upon which Pierre Marsan and Aimé Bensoussan will be called.

Sources

Electoral record (partial)

External links
 

1948 births
Living people
Politicians from Montreal
Quebec Liberal Party MNAs
Université de Montréal alumni
Université du Québec à Montréal alumni
21st-century Canadian politicians